Lance Dos Ramos (born 4 April 1985) is a Venezuelan actor, model and animator.

He was born in Caracas, the son of Portuguese immigrants. He is the brother of actress Kimberly Dos Ramos.

He is best known for the role of Chema Esquivel in the series Grachi. In 2011 he participated in the Venezuelan film "Memoirs of a Soldier" which was released in 2012.

Filmography

References

External links 

Living people
Venezuelan male telenovela actors
Venezuelan male television actors
1985 births
Venezuelan male models